The   is a Kofun period keyhole-shaped burial mound, located in the Otake neighborhood of the city of Yao, Osaka in the Kansai region of Japan. The tumulus was designated a National Historic Site of Japan in 1966 with the area under protection expanded in 1978.

Overview
It is located on a slope at an elevation of 30 meters, in the fan-shaped land at the western foot of the Ikoma Mountains, which runs north and south as a watershed between Yamato and Kawachi Provinces. The tumulus has a total length of 160 meters, with a 92-meter diameter posterior circular portion, and is orientated to the south. Since it was built along the contour lines of a natural slope, the surrounding moat was divided into two embankments on the south and north sides, making it a rare structure with different water levels in the east and west. It was once covered in fukiishi and had rows of over 3000  haniwa, which included figurative, pot-shaped and "morning-glory-shaped" versions as well as the more common cylindrical haniwa. There was a protrusion on the west side of the central construction, forming a ceremonial platform.

At the top of the posterior circle, there are three burial chambers of different lengths, of which the remains of a clay-covered wooden coffin was confirmed in the west side. Various burial items such as bronze mirrors, magatama, armor, iron swords, and iron spearheads were excavated from the surrounding area. Judging from these grave goods and the construction method, the tumulus was compiled in the middle Kofun period, or around the 5th century. During the Asuka period a Buddhist temple called Shingo-ji was constructed on the western side of the tumulus. The temple eventually disappeared, with its place name becoming distorted over time to become "Shinonji". The tumulus was first excavated in 1993, with further excavations occurring annually until 2003.

The tumulus and its surroundings are now maintained as an archaeological park and replicas of haniwa have been placed on the tumulus. Artifacts excavated from the tumulus are displayed at the Yao City Shionjiyama Kofun Learning Center, located next to the tumulus. The tumulus is about a five-minute walk from the "Otake" bus stop on the Kintetsu Bus from Kawachi-Yamamoto Station on the Kintetsu Osaka Line.

Total length 160 meters:
Anterior rectangular portion 90 meters wide x 12 meters high, 3-tier
Posterior circular portion 92 meter diameter x 13 meters high, 3-tiers

Gallery

See also
List of Historic Sites of Japan (Osaka)

References

External links

Yao City home page 
Yao City Shionjiyama Kofun Site Museum 
Yao City Tourist Information 

History of Osaka Prefecture
Yao, Osaka
Historic Sites of Japan
Archaeological sites in Japan
Kofun